Angur may refer to:

People
 Angur Baba Joshi (born 1932), Nepalese social activist
 Angur family, which owns Alliance University in Bangalore, India

Places
 Angūr, a village in Khorramabad County, Lorestan Province, Iran
 Angur Ada, a village and a border crossing between Pakistan and Afghanistan
 Pol-e Angur, a village in Khamir County, Hormozgan Province, Iran
 Qareh Angur, a village in Fariman County, Razavi Khorasan Province, Iran